John Contreras is an American cellist, best known for his work with Current 93 and Baby Dee. He has also performed with Marc Almond, Fovea Hex and Nurse With Wound. In addition to the cello, he also performs with the Buchla 200e. His work is released on the Durtro label.

References

External links 
 John Contreras on Myspace
 On Discogs
 [ AllMusic Profile]

American cellists
Living people
Year of birth missing (living people)
Place of birth missing (living people)